Phil Talmadge (born c. 1952) is an American politician, attorney, and jurist, who is currently a partner at the Seattle, Washington law firm Talmadge/Fitzpatrick. Talmadge graduated from Yale University and received a J.D. from the University of Washington. From 1979 to 1995 he represented West Seattle in the Washington State Senate, earning a reputation as a liberal reformer. After leaving the legislature, Talmadge served a single six-year term on the Supreme Court of Washington. In 2004 he was a candidate for the Democratic Party nomination for Governor of Washington, but withdrew from the race in the face of lackluster polling and personal health problems.

References

1950s births
Year of birth uncertain
Living people
Politicians from Seattle
Yale University alumni
University of Washington School of Law alumni
Washington (state) lawyers
Justices of the Washington Supreme Court
Democratic Party Washington (state) state senators